Ohio Issue 2 can refer to several ballot measures:
 1990 Cuyahoga County Issue 2, a successful ballot measure to fund the Gateway Sports and Entertainment Complex
 2011 Ohio Issue 2, a successful ballot measure to repeal a law that limited collective bargaining for public employees in the state
 2017 Ohio Issue 2, an unsuccessful ballot measure to lower prescription drug prices
 2022 Ohio Issue 2, a successful ballot measure to prohibiting local governments from allowing noncitizens to vote in local elections. 

Ohio ballot measures